Mazlaqan (also Romanized as Mazlaqān; also known as Marqakān, Mazdaqān, Mazdaqān-e Kohneh, Mazdaqān Kohneh, and Mazlaqān-e Kohneh) is a village in Bayat Rural District, Nowbaran District, Saveh County, Markazi Province, Iran. At the 2006 census, its population was 207, comprising some 81 families.

References 

Populated places in Saveh County